Cannole (Salentino:  or ; Griko:  translit. Cànnula) is a town and comune in the Italian province of Lecce in the Apulia region of south-east Italy, in what could be the "tip" of the "heel" of Italy.

The inhabitants of Cannole, alongside Italian, also speak Griko, a Greek dialect. The language, folklore, traditions and history of Cannole, like those of the eight other cities in the area called "Salentine Greece", reveal significant Greek influences over the course of time, presumably from the time of the Byzantine control, or even the ancient Magna Graecia colonisation in the 8th century BCE.

References

Cities and towns in Apulia
Localities of Salento